Simon Ramsay  may refer to:

 Simon Ramsay, 16th Earl of Dalhousie (1914–1999), statesman
 Simon Ramsay (politician), Australian politician